American musician Perfume Genius has released six studio albums, one extended play, 13 singles and 13 music videos to date. Mike Hadreas began his music career under the Perfume Genius moniker in 2008 when he set up his MySpace page. Two years later, he released his debut album, Learning. He has released four albums since; Put Your Back N 2 It in 2012, Too Bright in 2014, No Shape in 2017, and Set My Heart on Fire Immediately in 2020. All of his albums have been released by Matador Records and received critical acclaim according to Metacritic. No Shape and the song "Queen" have both appeared in Pitchfork's decade-end lists for the 2010s. In 2020, he had his first song to chart on the Adult Alternative Songs chart with "On the Floor".

Albums

Studio albums

Notes

Remix albums

Extended plays
 Reshaped (2018)

Singles

As lead artist

As featured artist

Other charted songs

Music videos

Remixes

References

External links
 Official website
 
 
 

Alternative rock discographies
Discographies of American artists